Castelraimondo is a comune (municipality) in the Province of Macerata in the Italian region Marche, located about  southwest of Ancona and about  southwest of Macerata.

Castelraimondo borders the following municipalities: Camerino, Fiuminata, Gagliole, Matelica, Pioraco, San Severino Marche, Serrapetrona. The main sights is the Cassero, a watchtower built by the Da Varano lords of Camerino in medieval times.

Main sights
The town contains the following churches: 
San Biagio.
San Lorenzo a Brondoleto.
San Martino a Rustano.
San Michele Arcangelo a Sant’Angelo.
Santa Maria Assunta a Collina.

References

Cities and towns in the Marche